(William) Richard Fletcher-Vane, 2nd Baron Inglewood  (born 31 July 1951), usually called Richard Inglewood, is a former Conservative Party politician in the United Kingdom. Lord Inglewood is a non-affiliated member of the House of Lords, a barrister and a chartered surveyor. He was a Member of the European Parliament from 1989 to 2004, and a junior minister in the UK government from 1995 to 1997.

Political career 
At the 1983 general election, he stood as the Conservative candidate in the safe Labour constituency of Houghton and Washington, where he finished third with 24% of the votes.

At the 1984 European Parliament election he stood unsuccessfully in the Durham constituency, then at the 1989 election he was elected as Member of the European Parliament (MEP) for Cumbria and Lancashire North. He lost his seat at the 1994 election, but in 1999 was elected for the new North West England constituency. He was the Conservative spokesman on Legal Affairs. He did not contest the 2004 election.

He was a government whip in the Lords from 1994 to 1995, serving as Deputy Chief Whip from January to July 1995. He was then appointed as a junior minister in the Department of National Heritage, serving until the Conservatives lost office at the 1997 general election. During that time he was responsible for broadcasting and heritage, and was Minister for Tourism.

Between 2011 and 2014 he was Chairman of the House of Lords Select Committee on Communications, and 2014–2015 Chairman of the Select Committee on Extradition Law.

Other interests 
He was Chairman of the CN Group, an independent local media business based in Carlisle 2002–2016, Chairman of Carr's Milling Industries plc 2005–2013, and of the Reviewing Committee on the Export of Works of Art 2003–2014, Chairman of Gen2 from 2016 until 2018 and President of Cumbria Tourist Board 2004 to 2019.  He was a visiting parliamentary fellow at St Antony's College Oxford 2014–2015, Chairman of the Cumbria Local Nature Partnership 2013–2017. Member Lake District Special Planning Board 1983–1989, Chairman of the Development Control (Planning Committee) of the Lake District National Park 1985–1989, Board Member North West Water Authority 1987–1989.

He has been a deputy lieutenant of Cumbria since 1993 and was appointed vice lord-lieutenant in 2013. In 2018 he became chairman of the Cumbria Local Enterprise Partnership, giving up the Conservative whip to do so. He is the current President of Cumbria Wildlife Trust and has been president of the Ancient Monuments Society since 2015, president of the British Art Market Federation since 2014, president of the Uplands Alliance since 2015, patron of the Livestock Auctioneers Association since 2016, president of the National Sheep Association since 2017, a Fellow of the Society of Antiquaries of London (FSA) since 2002, and is a director/trustee of the Public Interest News Foundation.

Personal life
Inglewood is the eldest son of Conservative Member of Parliament William Fletcher-Vane and his wife Mary née Proby. He was educated at Eton and at Trinity College, Cambridge, and was called to the bar at Lincoln's Inn in 1975. He married Cressida Pemberton-Pigott in 1986. They have one son, Hon. Henry William Frederick Fletcher-Vane, born in 1990, and two daughters.

His home is Hutton-in-the-Forest in the Inglewood Forest area of Cumbria.

References 

1951 births
Living people
Alumni of Trinity College, Cambridge
Barons in the Peerage of the United Kingdom
Conservative Party (UK) Baronesses- and Lords-in-Waiting
Conservative Party (UK) MEPs
Deputy Lieutenants of Cumbria
English barristers
Members of Lincoln's Inn
People educated at Eton College
MEPs for England 1989–1994
MEPs for England 1999–2004
Richard
Fellows of the Society of Antiquaries of London
British surveyors
Hereditary peers elected under the House of Lords Act 1999